Arkee Whitlock (born May 10, 1984) is a professional American and Canadian football running back who is currently a free agent. He most recently played for the Edmonton Eskimos of the Canadian Football League. He was signed by the Minnesota Vikings as an undrafted free agent in 2007. He played college football with the Southern Illinois Salukis, where he finished the 2007 season third in voting for the Walter Payton Award.

Whitlock has also been a member of the San Francisco 49ers.

Professional career
He was signed as an undrafted free agent following the 2007 NFL Draft by the Minnesota Vikings, and was subsequently cut during training camp.  Whitlock briefly signed with the San Francisco 49ers, and was able to see playing time during the preseason.  After he was waived by the 49ers, he again signed with the Vikings, where he was allocated to their practice squad.

Whitlock was signed by the Edmonton Eskimos on April 23, 2009. He was released on July 31, 2011.

References

External links
Minnesota Vikings bio
Southern Illinois Salukis bio

1984 births
Living people
People from Rock Hill, South Carolina
Players of American football from South Carolina
Players of Canadian football from South Carolina
Canadian football running backs
American football running backs
Southern Illinois Salukis football players
Minnesota Vikings players
San Francisco 49ers players
Edmonton Elks players